Nance v. Ward, 597 U.S. ___ (2022), was a United States Supreme Court case related to death row inmates' as-applied challenges to methods of execution.

Background 

In December 1993, Michael Nance robbed a bank and committed murder during a carjacking. He was convicted and sentenced to death soon thereafter. In January 2020, Nance filed an as-applied challenge to Georgia's execution protocol under , asserting its use of lethal injection would subject him to a level of pain that is unconstitutional under the Eighth Amendment to the United States Constitution. The district court dismissed Nance's claim on the basis that it was meritless and was untimely.

The United States Court of Appeals for the Eleventh Circuit found that Nance's request for a firing squad, which is not authorized by Georgia law, constituted an attack on his death sentence and thus had to be filed in the context of a writ of habeas corpus. Then, the court found the request was "second or successive," and vacated and remanded for the district court to dismiss for lack of jurisdiction. Judge Beverly B. Martin dissented. The court denied rehearing en banc over the dissent of Judge Charles R. Wilson, who was joined by two other judges. Nance filed a petition for a writ of certiorari.

Supreme Court 

Certiorari was granted in the case on January 14, 2022. Oral arguments were held on April 25, 2022.

Ruling 
On June 23, 2022, the Supreme Court reversed the Eleventh Circuit in a 5–4 vote. Justice Elena Kagan wrote the majority, and Justice Amy Coney Barrett wrote the dissent.

The court ruled that a claim for an alternative methods of execution that is not authorized by the state can still be addressed under  and does not need to be filed in the context of a writ of habeas corpus. This extends the reach of a claim under , to include alternative methods of execution not authorized by the state, as well as, those authorized by the state.

Opinion of the Court 
In her writing for the majority, Justice Kagan stated that it is through "comparative exercise" that the state does not "cruelly superadd(s)" pain onto the inmate, in violation of their Eighth Amendment rights. That the inmate has an option to choose a method of death that is not practiced by the state of imprisonment but also other states, this reduces the "burden" of the inmate. She adds that due to the "vagaries of state law”, if prisoners of different state have to file different types of claims (e.g. an inmate filing a §1983 claim in Alabama for a firing squad as their preferred choice of death and an inmate filing a habeas claim in Georgia for the same method of death), this "non-conformity" would be "strange". She wrote that the inmate claim for a differing death method is not dispute their death sentence and does not prevent or burden the state from issuing the death penalty to the inmate, the state can simply change its laws on death penalty as they have done before.

Dissent 
In her dissent, Justice Barrett wrote that the claim by the prisoner would prevent the state from executing the prisoner as the state does not practice such a method of execution under their laws, therefore the claim made should be a habeas claim and not a claim under . She rebuts the majority claim by arguing that the non-conformity is an "unremarkable consequence of federalism" and enjoinment of the death sentence is to enjoin enforcement of it, therefore a habeas claim should be filed.

Reactions 

Matthew Hellman, a partner of the law firm that represented the inmate, released a statement saying that the ruling provides the inmate "a pathway to seek a humane and lawful execution".

References

External links 
 

2022 in United States case law
United States Supreme Court cases
United States Supreme Court cases of the Roberts Court
United States death penalty case law
United States habeas corpus case law